The Best of Donovan may refer to

The Best of Donovan (1969 album)
The Best of Donovan (1982 album)